Isophelliidae is a family of sea anemones belonging to the order Actiniaria.

Genera:
 Isophellia Carlgren, 1900

References

Actiniaria
Cnidarian families